Kasota Lake is a lake in Kandiyohi County, in the U.S. state of Minnesota.

Kasota is a name derived from the Dakota language meaning "cleared place".

See also
List of lakes in Minnesota

References

Lakes of Minnesota
Lakes of Kandiyohi County, Minnesota